King Island Council is a local government body in Tasmania, encompassing King Island and the adjacent minor islands within Bass Strait, in the north-west of the state. The King Island local government area is classified as rural and has a population of 1,601, with Currie as the main town and administrative centre.

History and attributes
The King Island municipality was established on 1 January 1907 King Island is classified as rural, agricultural and small (RAS) under the Australian Classification of Local Governments.

Localities
 Bungaree
 Currie
 Egg Lagoon
 Grassy
 Loorana
 Lymwood
 Naracoopa
 Nugara
 Pearshape
 Pegarah
 Reekara
 Sea Elephant
 Surprise Bay
 Wickham
 Yambacoona
 Yarra Creek

See also
List of local government areas of Tasmania

References

External links
King Island Council official website
Local Government Association Tasmania
Tasmanian Electoral Commission - local government

Local government areas of Tasmania
King Island (Tasmania)